Road to Boston  is an upcoming South Korean film written and directed by Kang Je-gyu starring Ha Jung-woo, Bae Seong-woo, and Im Si-wan. It tells the story of Korean athletes who participated in the Boston International Marathon in 1947, the first international marathon held since World War II. It is scheduled to be released theatrically in September 2023 coinciding with Korean holiday.

Cast 
 Ha Jung-woo as Sohn Kee-chung
 Bae Seong-woo as Nam Sung-yong
 Im Si-wan as Suh Yun-bok
 Park Eun-bin
 Kim Sang-ho
 Choi Gyu-hwan

Production 
The script reading was held on the September 4, 2019, and filming began on September 9 in Seoul. In January 2020, actors of Boston 1947 departed for Australia for the shooting of the film.

References

External links
 
 
 
 

Upcoming films
2020s Korean-language films
2020s South Korean films
South Korean sports films
South Korean films based on actual events
Films set in 1947
South Korean biographical films
Cultural depictions of track and field athletes
Films shot in Seoul
Films shot in Australia
Boston Marathon
Running films